Guadalupe Ledezma Sanchez (born October 28, 1961) is a former American football defensive back in the National Football League (NFL) who played for the Pittsburgh Steelers from 1986 to 1988. He played college football for the UCLA Bruins. Sanchez also played in the United States Football League (USFL) for the Arizona Wranglers and Orlando Renegades.

References

1961 births
Living people
American football defensive backs
American football return specialists
Pittsburgh Steelers players
Arizona Wranglers players
UCLA Bruins football players